Julia Ann Sears (1839–1929) was a pioneering academic and suffragist, achieving a milestone early in her career as she became the first woman to head a public college in the United States, in 1872. The school was Mankato Normal School, now Minnesota State University, Mankato, which named a residence hall after Sears in 2008.

Overview 
1. East Dennis, Cape Cod, Massachusetts: Birthplace

2. Bridgewater State University: 1859 Graduate

3. Minnesota State University: President 1872-1873

4. Minnesota Historical Society, St. Paul

5. Peabody College, Vanderbilt University: Professor and Head of Mathematics Department, 1875 - 1907

6. Fairhaven, Massachusetts: Retirement

Family History 
The Sears family lineage begins with Richard Sares, who lived in the Plymouth Colony around 1630. The Sears family also includes Edmond Sears, who, in 1849, composed "It Came Upon the Midnight Clear". Most of the notable members of the Sears family had an educational or religious backgrounds. Constant, Sears' father, was born in 1802 and died in 1861. Sears' mother, Deborah was born on April 19, 1801 and died in 1861. Constant and Deborah married in 1824. Constant was sea captain and retired to be a cranberry farmer and salt manufacturer. Overall, the Sears' Family consists primarily of sea captains, religious figures in Methodist and Baptist faith, as well as educators.

Early life 

Julia Ann Sears was born to Constant and Deborah Chipman Sears on March 19, 1839 in East Dennis, Cape Cod, Massachusetts. Julia was the youngest of five siblings: Thankful Snow, Emily, Sarah R., and Betsey Thomas. Her mother had another daughter, who died in 1832. Julia had no uncles or brothers. It is suggested, this may have helped her develop a sense of independence. As children, Julia and her sisters underwent religious training by Methodist ministers, at month-long summer camps. In her later years, Sears recalled pretending to be a teacher when playing with friends. This may have been an early indicator of her future career.

Education 
Julia Sears attended a common school in East Dennis, from age five to age fifteen. Though it remains unclear, it is believed Sears attended the East Dennis Academy from 1854 to 1858. During this time, Julia decided she wanted to be an educator. Sears moved away from home and attended Bridgewater Normal School from 1858 to 1860. Students were asked to affirm their devotion to becoming a teacher or they would be charged $10 for every term they attended the school. The principle of Bridgewater Normal School, Marshall Conant, had a passion for mathematics, astronomy and mechanics. Julia Sears and Mr. Conant worked closely together during her time as a student there, possibly influencing her later career choice of becoming a mathematics professor. At the end of her education, Julia Sears received a General Diploma of the Institution, similar to a modern-day GED.

Teaching 
Between 1860 and 1866 Julia Sears taught at a normal school in Cape Cod. In 1866, Sears was a teacher in Western State Normal School, later to be named Farmington State Normal School. The principal of Western State Normal School was George M. Gage, but in 1868 he moved to Mankato, Minnesota. Julia Sears had known George Gage, as a schoolmate, at Bridgewater Normal School. After Gage's departure, Sears went to teach at Prescott School for Boys and Girls in Charlestown, Boston. From 1869 to 1871, Sears was the Head Assistant in Boston. In the summer of 1870, George Gage offered Sears the position of Head Assistant at Mankato Normal School, but Sears refused this offer. During this time, Sears studied at the Massachusetts Institute of Technology.

Mankato Normal School
Julia Sears started teaching at the Mankato Normal School, now known as Minnesota State University, in 1871. After only one year, Sears made history by becoming the president in 1872. At this point in history, this kind of achievement was not well documented or communicated well. For the next 50–80 years, there are documents of other women believed to be the first female presidents of a U.S. public college.

Her first address to its female graduates was forthright, stating:

You are stepping out into life at a time when you hear not the sound, 'thus far in education may you go and no farther, this place you may fill, but not that'; but, instead, universities and colleges open wide their doors and bid you enter, and any place you are fitted to fill is no longer denied you.

However, such frankness was still controversial, and she was forced to leave the university after only a year. She retained considerable support among the students and the Mankato community. This support shifted into a protest, becoming so heated that it resulted in expulsions and was known as the Sears Rebellion.

She then took a post as professor of mathematics at Peabody Normal School (now Peabody College of Vanderbilt University) in Nashville, Tennessee. In Nashville, she worked tirelessly as an advocate of women's rights and in particular the right to vote. She remained at Peabody until her retirement in 1907, and a portrait of her, painted in 1904, hangs today in the Peabody library.

At her death in 1929, the campus newspaper said, "Her precision, her accuracy, her fairness, her brilliant demonstrations, and, above all, her ability to inspire the ambition of all those she taught became famous incidents of her instruction at Peabody." This quote was inscribed on the wall of a newly constructed residence hall that was named in her honor at Minnesota State University, Mankato in 2015, and is a reminder of the impact on the community.

References

External links
Employee Guide, MSU Mankato (PDF document, quoting Sears in preface)
The Sears Rebellion
References from Biographical Index of Tennessee Women
Art Collection of Peabody Library
Department of Residential Life— Minnesota State University, Mankato at www.mnsu.edu

1839 births
1929 deaths
American suffragists
American women's rights activists
People from Mankato, Minnesota
Minnesota State University, Mankato alumni
People from Nashville, Tennessee
Presidents of Minnesota State University, Mankato
Vanderbilt University faculty
Women heads of universities and colleges
American women academics